"Straight to the Heart" is a song written by Terry Britten and Graham Lyle, and recorded by American country music artist Crystal Gayle.  It was released in November 1986 as the second single and title track from the album Straight to the Heart.  The song was Gayle's 18th and, to date, last No. 1 hit of her career.

Charts

References

1986 singles
Crystal Gayle songs
Songs written by Graham Lyle
Songs written by Terry Britten
Song recordings produced by Jim Ed Norman
Warner Records singles
1986 songs